The New Zealand men's national football team represents New Zealand in men's international football competitions. The team is governed by the governing body for football in New Zealand, New Zealand Football (NZF), which is currently a member of FIFA and Oceania Football Confederation (OFC). The team's official nickname is the All Whites. New Zealand is a five-time OFC champion.

The team represented New Zealand at the FIFA World Cup tournaments in 1982 and 2010, and the FIFA Confederations Cup tournaments in 1999, 2003, 2009 and 2017. Because most New Zealand football clubs are semi-professional rather than fully professional, most professional New Zealand footballers play for clubs in English-speaking countries such as England, the United States and Australia. However, there are also New Zealand footballers who now play for clubs in European league such as Italy, Denmark, and Turkey.

History

Early years

New Zealand's first international football match was played in Dunedin at the old Caledonian Ground on 23 July 1904 against a team representing New South Wales. New Zealand lost by the game's only goal, but drew with the same team 3–3 in a game at Athletic Park, Wellington seven days later. The following year the team played a Wellington representative side on 10 June before embarking on a tour of Australia, during which they played eleven representative sides, including three "test matches" against New South Wales. Of these three matches they won one, lost one, and drew one.

A New Zealand national team did not play again until 1922, when New Zealand played three official full internationals against Australia, played at Carisbrook in Dunedin, Athletic Park in Wellington, and Auckland Domain. The results were two 3–1 wins to New Zealand and a 1–1 draw in Wellington. In 1927, Canada became the second team to play in New Zealand as they played in four official matches with a win and a draw.

New Zealand would become one of the founder members of the Oceania Football Confederation in 1966 which was founded between Charlie Dempsey and his Australian colleague Jim Bayutti in founding the federation.

1980s success
According to Te Ara: The Encyclopedia of New Zealand, up until the 1980s "the high visibility of British migrants in the All Whites, as well as in the game's administration and domestic club scene, attracted negative comments". The All Whites qualified for the 1982 FIFA World Cup, losing all three of its games by multiple goals. Of the 22-man squad, 11 members were born in the United Kingdom, including seven in England alone. This included the captain Steve Sumner and striker Steve Wooddin, who had both played club football in England before immigrating. However, over the following decades the composition of the national squad changed and "the face of football became increasingly Kiwi".

Since the 1990s, United States college soccer has played a significant role in the development of New Zealand players. This influence began when former Scotland international Bobby Clark returned to the US after his 1994–96 stint as New Zealand head coach to take the head coaching job at Stanford University (he now holds the same position at Notre Dame). Clark began recruiting in New Zealand, and former New Zealand national players Ryan Nelsen and Simon Elliott played for him at Stanford. The trend that Clark started has continued to the present; more than two dozen New Zealanders are now playing for NCAA Division I men's programmes in the US. A common next step in these players' career paths is a stint in Major League Soccer; ESPN soccernet journalist Brent Latham speculated in a March 2010 story that New Zealand's 2010 FIFA World Cup squad could have more MLS players than the US squad. However, Latham's speculation did not prove true, as only one MLS player made the New Zealand squad for the World Cup. New Zealand formerly competed against Australia for top honours in the OFC. However, after Australia left to join the AFC in 2006, New Zealand were left as the only seeded team in the OFC. New Zealand qualified for the 2010 FIFA World Cup though exited the competition after the first round despite being the only team not to lose a game during the tournament because they drew 1–1 vs defending champions Italy, Slovakia and 0–0 vs Paraguay while eventual champions Spain lost to Switzerland. New Zealand notably finished above Italy in their group as Italy lost to Slovakia in their final group match and finished with two points compared to New Zealand's three.

2018 FIFA World Cup qualification

In August 2014, Anthony Hudson was appointed manager of the All Whites. Hudson's first game in charge of the national team was a 3–1 defeat away to Uzbekistan in September 2014. As a result of the All Whites playing "just three matches" in the previous year, which was "the least of any country in world football", and having "seven months without a match" the All Whites dropped to 161 in the FIFA world rankings. The All Whites went on to win the 2016 OFC Nations Cup, winning four matches with the final being won via a penalty shootout after a 0–0 draw against Papua New Guinea, conceding only 1 goal, from a penalty, in the process. New Zealand's victory saw them crowned Oceania champions making New Zealand the most successful national team in the competition's history, having won the tournament five times, and also saw them qualify for the 2017 FIFA Confederations Cup in Russia. The All Whites moved up 54 places in the world rankings in July and achieved 88th in the FIFA world rankings, the highest ranking in three years, on the back of the OFC Nations Cup victory that qualified them for the 2017 FIFA Confederations Cup.

After a disappointing tournament at the 2017 FIFA Confederations Cup where they finished bottom of their group which featured Russia, Mexico and Portugal, the national team fell 27 places to 122nd. In September 2017, New Zealand won the OFC Final against the Solomon Islands with an aggregate score of 8–3 to qualify for the inter-continental play-off qualifier against Peru, the fifth-ranked nation from the South America's qualifiers. After holding Peru off in the first leg, they would go to lose 2–0 in the second leg to be eliminated from competition as Peru became the last team to qualify for the 2018 FIFA World Cup.

Rivalries

Australia

New Zealand's long time rivals are Trans-Tasman neighbours Australia. The two teams' history dates back to 1922, where they first met in both their international debuts. The rivalry between the Socceroos (Australia) and the All Whites (New Zealand) is part of a wider friendly rivalry between the geographical neighbours Australia and New Zealand, which applies not only to sport but to the culture of the two countries. The rivalry was intensified when Australia and New Zealand were both members of the OFC, regularly competing in OFC Nations Cup finals and in FIFA World Cup qualifications, where only one team from the OFC progressed to the World Cup. Since Australia left the OFC to join the AFC in 2006, competition between the two teams has been less frequent. However, the rivalry between the two teams is still strong, with the occasional match receiving much media and public attention. The rivalry extends to club football, with New Zealand's only fully professional team, the Wellington Phoenix, playing in the Australian A-League.

Team image
New Zealand's traditional home colours are white with a black trim, while its away kits are usually reversed, featuring black with a white trim. This reversal of the colour scheme by New Zealand's football team is due to the fact that black was traditionally reserved for referees by FIFA.

During the qualification for the 1982 FIFA World Cup, the team appeared for the first time in an all white uniform against Taiwan in 1981. This led a commentator to dub them the "All Whites", a play on the traditional name "All Blacks" used for the national rugby team. The name stuck, and was popularised in the song "Marching off to Spain" with its chant refrain "Kiwis! All Whites!". More recently, the nickname has been scrutinised by New Zealand Football due to its unintended racial overtones.

Supporters
The main supporters group of the New Zealand national team are known as the 'White Noise'. White Noise was formed in November 2007 with the supporters group of the Wellington Phoenix, 'Yellow Fever', rebranding themselves when the national sides play.

Kit

Kit suppliers

Results and fixtures

The following is a list of match results in the last 12 months, as well as any future matches that have been scheduled.

2022

2023

Coaching staff

Players
For all past and present players who have appeared for the national team, see New Zealand national team players.

Current squad
The following 24 players were called up for the two friendly matches against China on 23 and 26 March 2023.

Caps and goals updated as of 25 September 2022 after the game against Australia.

Recent call-ups
The following players have been called up within the last 12 months and remain eligible for selection.

INJ Withdrew due to injury
PRE Preliminary squad / standby
RET Retired from the national team
SUS Serving suspension
WD Player withdrew from the squad due to non-injury issue.

Records

Players in bold are still active with New Zealand.

Most capped players

Top goalscorers

Most clean sheets

Competitive record
For the all-time record of the national team against opposing nations, see the team's all-time record page.

As at 25 September 2022

FIFA World Cup

OFC Nations Cup

FIFA Confederations Cup

Summer Olympics

Minor tournaments

FIFA Rankings 

 Best Ranking   Worst Ranking   Best Mover   Worst Mover

Honours
OFC Nations Cup
Champions (5): 1973, 1998, 2002, 2008, 2016
Runners-up (1): 2000
Third place (3): 1996, 2004, 2012

Minor competitions
Trans-Tasman Cup
Champions (2): 1983, 1987
Runners-up (4): 1986, 1988, 1991, 1995
Merdeka Tournament
Champions (1): 2000
'''AFC–OFC Challenge Cup
Runners-up (1): 2003

See also
 New Zealand women's national football team
 Football in New Zealand
 Trans-Tasman Cup

References

External links

New Zealand Football
New Zealand men's national football team international matches 

 
Oceanian national association football teams
1904 establishments in New Zealand
Association football in New Zealand